Darling Media is an independent, quarterly women’s magazine. A magazine "developed upon the foundation of empowerment of women." Meghan, Duchess of Sussex, Lauren Conrad, Jennifer Morrison, Olivia Wilde, Kathy Bates, Kristen Bell, Minka Kelly, and YouTube personalities Ingrid Nilsen and Lilly Singh are among a few notable people who have been featured in their previous issues. The magazine is based in Los Angeles, California, United States.

The Magazine
Darling Magazine’s Founder and Editor-in-Chief Sarah Dubbeldam, and her husband Steve Dubbeldam created Darling in 2009. The magazine began as a blog and produced its first print issue in the fall of 2012.  Darling is advertised as embracing women of different ethnicities and body types and no photographs are retouched to alter women's faces or bodies. Its articles tend to include topics of self-empowerment, self-improvement, career, relationships, style, travel, recipes, interviews, features, and stories from a pool of selected creative contributors. All articles are paired with photographs that are specifically shot for each article. Within each issue, Darling partitions articles within eight “personas” which are: The Dreamer, The Hostess, The Confident, The Stylist, The Explorer, The Beautician, The Intellectual, and The Achiever.

In addition to its print publication, Darling hosts “Darling Dinner” events that take place around the United States. Each event is themed around a selected topic and invites the community to gather to share a meal and engage in conversation. Darling also holds "Darling Retreat" events hosting workshops, meals and guided conversations for personal growth and entrepreneurship.

Darling Media 
In 2017, Darling Media introduced a new equity crowdfunding portal from Micro ventures and Indiegogo and raised $409,923 with 809 investors.

Darling Movement
In 2013, Darling launched the #DarlingMovement in hope to get their readers to get involved after reading the Darling issues. The movement, according to Darling, represents the effort to live out Darling’s mission statement through a multitude of ways that include their readers’ involvement. It allows their readers to share their voice and how they connect with the mission of Darling.

Reception
Darling has been commended for its content in which it displays beauty in aspects outside the norm. The Los Angeles Times described Darling as a magazine that uses 'models of all shapes and sizes' and eschews retouching and photoshopping.”  The Huffington Post has noted that Darling “encourages a woman to be the best version of herself rather than a cheap one-dimensional imitation of a false reality.” Paper & Type Graphic Design Co. has also called Darling magazine a "publication that roots for womankind, with articles to encourage, to sweeten and cheer, to listen to, and to celebrate women." In July 2016, the publication was featured as a "small business success" on Morning Express with Robin Meade.

Philanthropy
Darling donates a portion of its proceeds from the sale of its magazine to support the fight against sex trafficking in the Dominican Republic.

References

External links
 Official website

Independent magazines
Lifestyle magazines published in the United States
Magazines established in 2009
Magazines published in Los Angeles
Quarterly magazines published in the United States
Women's magazines published in the United States